Pedro Muñoz, (born 9 June 1986) is a Chilean footballer who currently plays for Primera B de Chile club Deportes Santa Cruz as a forward.

Career

O'Higgins

Muñoz was signed by O'Higgins for 3 years in the beginning of the 2015–16 season. He came to the celestes after seven years in Universidad de Concepción, where was managed by Pablo Sánchez.

Honours

Club
Universidad de Concepción
Copa Chile: 2008, 2014–15

References

External links
 Muñoz at Football Lineups
 

1986 births
Living people
Chilean footballers
Chilean Primera División players
Primera B de Chile players
Universidad de Concepción footballers
O'Higgins F.C. footballers
Curicó Unido footballers
Cobresal footballers
Coquimbo Unido footballers
Association football forwards